Arctic Chill (Icelandic: Vetrarborgin) is a 2008 translation of a 2005 crime novel by Icelandic author Arnaldur Indriðason, in his Detective Erlendur series.

The book is the first of Indriðason's works to be translated into English by someone other than Bernard Scudder, as he died of a heart attack before his translation was complete. Victoria Cribb completed it.

Erlendur and his team investigate the murder of a young Thai boy, found frozen in his own blood one midwinter day outside a rundown apartment block. The crime may be racially motivated and the team soon uncovers some unpleasant truths about modern Icelandic society. The subject of racism is examined, as well as immigration of Asians to Iceland.

2005 novels
Novels by Arnaldur Indriðason